The family Anthelidae comprise the "Australian woolly bears" and are found only in Australia and New Guinea. This list consists of the species found in Australia. It is an index to the species articles and forms part of the full List of moths of Australia.

Anthelinae
Anthela achromata Turner, 1904
Anthela addita (Walker, 1865)
Anthela adriana (Swinhoe, 1902)
Anthela allocota Turner, 1921
Anthela ariprepes Turner, 1921
Anthela asciscens (T.P. Lucas, 1891)
Anthela astata Turner, 1926
Anthela asterias (Meyrick, 1891)
Anthela barnardi Turner, 1922
Anthela basigera (Walker, 1865)
Anthela callileuca Turner, 1922
Anthela callispila Lower, 1905
Anthela callixantha (Lower, 1902)
Anthela canescens (Walker, 1855)
Anthela cinerascens (Walker, 1855)
Anthela clementi (Swinhoe, 1902)
Anthela cnecias Turner, 1921
Anthela connexa (Walker, 1855)
Anthela decolor Turner, 1939
Anthela deficiens (Walker, 1865)
Anthela denticulata (Newman, 1856)
Anthela euryphrica Turner, 1936
Anthela excellens (Walker, 1855)
Anthela exoleta (Swinhoe, 1892)
Anthela ferruginosa Walker, 1855
Anthela guenei (Newman, 1856)
Anthela habroptila Turner, 1921
Anthela heliopa (Lower, 1902)
Anthela hyperythra Turner, 1921
Anthela inornata (Walker, 1855)
Anthela limonea (Butler, 1874)
Anthela neurospasta Turner, 1902
Anthela nicothoe (Boisduval, 1832)
Anthela ocellata (Walker, 1855)
Anthela ochroptera (Lower, 1892)
Anthela oressarcha Turner, 1921
Anthela ostra Swinhoe, 1903
Anthela phaeodesma Turner, 1921
Anthela phoenicias Turner, 1902
Anthela postica (Walker, 1855)
Anthela protocentra (Meyrick, 1891)
Anthela pudica (Swinhoe, 1902)
Anthela pyrrhobaphes Turner, 1926
Anthela reltoni (T.P. Lucas, 1895)
Anthela repleta (Walker, 1855)
Anthela rubeola (R. Felder, 1874)
Anthela rubicunda (Swinhoe, 1902)
Anthela stygiana (Butler, 1882)
Anthela subfalcata (Walker, 1855)
Anthela tetraphrica Turner, 1921
Anthela unisigna Swinhoe, 1903
Anthela varia (Walker, 1855)
Anthela virescens Turner, 1939
Anthela xantharcha (Meyrick, 1891)
Anthela xanthocera Turner, 1922
Chelepteryx chalepteryx (R. Felder, 1874)
Chelepteryx collesi Gray, 1835
Chenuala heliaspis (Meyrick, 1891)
Nataxa amblopis (Turner, 1944)
Nataxa flavescens (Walker, 1855)
Omphaliodes obscura (Walker, 1855)
Pterolocera amplicornis Walker, 1855
Pterolocera elizabetha (White, 1841)
Pterolocera ferruginea Strand, 1925
Pterolocera ferrugineofusca Strand, 1925
Pterolocera insignis (Herrich-Schäffer, 1856)
Pterolocera isogama Turner, 1931
Pterolocera leucocera (Turner, 1921)
Pterolocera rubescens (Walker, 1865)

Munychryiinae
Gephyroneura cosmia Turner, 1921
Munychryia periclyta Common & McFarland, 1970
Munychryia senicula Walker, 1865

External links 
Anthelidae at the Australian Faunal Directory
Anthelidae at butterflyhouse.com.au

Australia